Onychiuridae is a family of Collembola.
This family has 600 species in 51 genera.

List of genera 
According to  Checklist of the Collembola of the World:
 Onychiurinae Lubbock, 1867
 Cribrochiurini Weiner, 1996
 Cribrochiurus Weiner, 1996
 Hymenaphorurini Pomorski, 1996
 Arneria Pomorski, 2000
 Dinochiurus Pomorski & Steinmann, 2004
 Heteraphorura Bagnall, 1948
 Hymenaphorura Bagnall, 1948
 Kalaphorura Absolon, 1901
 Paronychiurus Bagnall, 1948
 Probolaphorura Dunger, 1977
 Protaphorurodes Bagnall, 1949
 Psyllaphorura Bagnall, 1948
 Reducturus Pomorski & Steinmann, 2004
 Sacaphorura Pomorski & Steinmann, 2004
 Vexaphorura Pomorski & Steinmann, 2004
 Wandaphorura Pomorski, 2007
 Oligaphorurini Bagnall, 1949
 Archaphorura Bagnall, 1949
 Chribellphorura Weiner, 1996
 Dimorphaphorura Bagnall, 1949
 Micraphorura Bagnall, 1949
 Oligaphorura Bagnall, 1949
 Onychiurini Börner, 1906
 Absolonia Börner, 1901
 Argonychiurus Bagnall, 1949
 Bionychiurus Pomorski, 1996
 Deharvengiurus Weiner, 1996
 Deuteraphorura Absolon, 1901
 Ongulonychiurus Thibaud & Massoud, 1986
 Onychiuroides Bagnall, 1948
 Onychiurus Gervais, 1841
 Orthonychiurus Stach, 1954
 Pilonychiurus Pomorski, 2007
 Similonychiurus Pomorski, 2007
 Vibronychiurus Pomorski, 1998
 Protaphorurini Bagnall, 1949
 Jacekaphorura Pomorski & Babenko, 2010
 Megaphorura Fjellberg, 1998
 Protaphorura Absolon, 1901
 Spelaphorura Bagnall, 1948
 Supraphorura Stach, 1954
 Yoshiiphorura Jordana & Martínez, 2004
 Thalassaphorurini Pomorski, 1998
 Agraphorura Pomorski, 1998
 Allonychiurus Yoshii, 1995
 Detriturus Pomorski, 1998
 Micronychiurus Bagnall, 1949
 Sensillonychiurus Pomorski & Sveenkova, 2006
 Spinonychiurus Weiner, 1996
 Tantulonychiurus Pomorski, 1996
 Thalassaphorura Bagnall, 1949
 Uralaphorura Martynova, 1978
 Lophognathellinae Stach, 1954
 Lophognathella Börner in Schultze, 1908
 Ussuriaphorura Martynova, 1979
 Tetrodontophorinae Stach, 1954
 Anodontophorus Pomorski, 2007
 Homaloproctus Börner, 1909
 Tetrodontophora Reuter, 1882

References

External links 
 ITIS Onychiuridae

Collembola
Arthropod families
Taxa named by John Lubbock, 1st Baron Avebury